Parrotbill or Parrot's bill may refer to:

Birds 
 Parrotbills, a group of birds native to East and Southeast Asia
 Bearded reedling, also known as Bearded parrotbill
 Parrot crossbill, colloquially also known as parrotbill, a small passerine bird
 Maui parrotbill, a bird of Hawaii
 Parrotbill, a regional name for the auk

Other uses 
 Parrot's bill, alternative name of the two flowering plants in the Clianthus genus, native to New Zealand
 the beak of a parrot
 any tool in the shape of a parrot's beak, for example a type of pruning shears

See also 
 Parrot's beak (disambiguation)